Horie (written 堀江 lit. "canal") is a Japanese surname. Notable people with the surname include:

, Japanese baseball player
, Japanese musician
, Japanese singer-songwriter
, Japanese voice actor
, Japanese actor and film director
, Japanese yachtsman
, Japanese photographer and writer
, Japanese rugby union player
, Japanese singer and voice actress
Richard Horie, American comic artist
, Japanese television announcer
, Japanese rugby union player
, Japanese voice actor
, Japanese footballer and manager
, Japanese billionaire
, Japanese writer
, Japanese singer and voice actress

See also
Horie Station, a railway station in Matsuyama, Ehime Prefecture, Japan

Japanese-language surnames